The Hamptons, part of the East End of Long Island, consist of the towns of Southampton and East Hampton, which together comprise the South Fork of Long Island, in Suffolk County, New York. The Hamptons are a popular seaside resort and one of the historical summer colonies of the northeastern United States.

The Montauk Branch of the Long Island Rail Road, the Montauk Highway, and private bus services connect the Hamptons to the rest of Long Island and to New York City, while ferries provide connections to Shelter Island, New York and Connecticut.

Stony Brook University's Southampton campus is located in the Hamptons.

West to east

The Hamptons include the following hamlets and villages in the town of Southampton:

 Eastport (hamlet)
 Speonk (hamlet)
 Remsenburg (hamlet)
 Westhampton (hamlet)
 West Hampton Dunes (village)
 Westhampton Beach (village)
 Quogue (village)
 East Quogue (hamlet)
 Hampton Bays (hamlet)
Places of Interest: Shinnecock Bay
 Shinnecock Hills (hamlet)
 North Sea
 Southampton (village)
 Water Mill  (hamlet)
 Bridgehampton (hamlet)
 Sagaponack (village)
 Sag Harbor (village, shared with East Hampton)

The Hamptons include the following hamlets and villages in the town of East Hampton:

Sag Harbor (village, shared with Southampton)
 Wainscott
 East Hampton (village)
 Northwest Harbor
 Springs
 Amagansett
 Montauk

The Shinnecock Reservation of the Shinnecock Indian Nation lies within the borders of the Town of Southampton, adjoining Shinnecock Hills and the Village of Southampton.

Places
These areas constitute the core vacation area of the east end of Long Island.

Description
The Hamptons are home to many communities. Historically, it has been devoted to agriculture and fishing. Many farms are still in operation in the area. There are three commercial vineyards operating in the Hamptons as well.

Given the area's geographic location, it maintained strong commercial and social links to New England and the nearby states of Connecticut and Rhode Island. Many of the original settlers were from and most of the trade links were with communities in Connecticut. Indeed, much of the older architecture and aesthetics of the villages in the Hamptons resemble New England. This is especially true for Sag Harbor Village and East Hampton Village.

Once direct rail links to New York City were established, the community of summer vacation residents expanded significantly. The Village of Southampton, which is the oldest of the Hamptons and the most westward of the villages in the core area of the Hamptons, grew rapidly. It remains the largest and most diverse of the Hamptons' towns. The other villages and hamlets grew at a slower rate over time.

The agriculture community became supplemented by artisans and professionals (mainly in Southampton Village and Sag Harbor Village), and then by a large influx of artists. As a result, the arts community in the Hamptons has origins extending back to the nineteenth century.   The Art Village in Southampton and the community of Springs in East Hampton town hosted a number of resident artists and art schools (e.g., the Shinnecock Hills Summer School founded by William Merritt Chase).

Current profile

The villages and the hamlets are distinguished by how their significant population increases during the summers, although the Hamptons have increasingly become year-round destinations for New Yorkers seeking a refuge on weekends.

Residential real estate prices in the Hamptons rank among the highest in the U.S., and, as of 2015, the real estate market was very strong with prices rising for both home buyers and sellers, as well as for rentals. Historically, real estate south of Route 27 ("south of the highway"), the main transportation artery in the Hamptons, was more highly valued. Land south of Route 27 is closer to the ocean, and the road served as a marker for social standing and land valuation.

The most expensive neighborhoods lie south of the highway, and most of all in the so-called Estate Areas of Southampton Village, Water Mill, Bridgehampton, Sagaponack and East Hampton Village. Notable streets include Ox Pasture Road, Halsey Neck Lane, Coopers Neck Lane and First Neck Lane in Southampton Village and Lee Avenue and West End Road in East Hampton Village. Oceanfront property commands a high premium over other real estate. The oceanfront streets in Southampton Village (Gin Lane and Meadow Lane) and East Hampton Village (Lily Pond Lane, Further Lane and West End Road) rank among the most expensive roads in the country. Meadow Lane in Southampton Village is sometimes referred to as "Billionaire's Lane".

Sagaponack, Water Mill, and Bridgehampton were cited by Business Week magazine as being the first, sixth, and eighth most expensive ZIP codes in the nation, respectively. In 2015, according to Business Insider, the 11962 ZIP code encompassing Sagaponack, within Southampton, was listed as the most expensive in the U.S., by real estate-listings site Property Shark, with a median home sale price of $5,125,000. In 2016, according to Business Insider, the 11962 ZIP code encompassing Sagaponack, within Southampton, was listed as the most expensive in the U.S., with a median home sale price of $8.5 million.

Amenities in the area include the Southampton Arts Center, the Southampton Cultural Center, the Pollock-Krasner House and Study Center in Springs; the Parrish Art Museum and the Watermill Center in Water Mill; the Guild Hall, a museum and theater, in East Hampton. In the sporting world, the region's golf courses are very highly regarded. The private golf clubs in Southampton are among the most exclusive and expensive in the nation. Those courses include the National Golf Links of America, the Shinnecock Hills Golf Club, and the Sebonack Golf Club. These golf clubs are currently ranked 8th, 4th and 41st within the United States by Golf Digest. There is also the Maidstone Club in East Hampton, ranked 72nd by Golf Digest.

Other private clubs include The Bathing Corporation of Southampton, the Southampton Bath and Tennis Club, and the Meadow Club in Southampton Village.

In 2019, according to Tim Davis and The Financial Times, home prices in The Hamptons fell 19.3 per cent in the first quarter while the median sale price of a single family home was $860,000. The locals blamed Donald Trump's tax changes for deterring wealthy buyers in 2019.

History
The Hamptons' history as a dwelling place for the wealthy dates from the late nineteenth century when the community changed from a farming community with good potato ground to a popular destination. In 1893 The New York Times wrote

As of 2015, commercial and point residential development continues and the Hamptons remain a vacation spot for the wealthy. The Hamptons have also become a notable place for prominent members of the LGBT community. Beaches in the Southeastern United States have been referred to as "The Hamptons of the South", including Figure Eight Island in North Carolina, Hilton Head Island and Kiawah Island in South Carolina, and South Walton in Florida.

Media
Dan's Papers, which originally began as the Montauk Pioneer on July 1, 1960, is published by Schneps Media.

Transportation
The Hamptons are connected to New York City and the rest of Long Island by a series of roadways (most notable of which are Route 27A, also known as Montauk Highway, and Route 27, also known as Sunrise Highway), rail service, and bus service. There are also several small airports throughout the Hamptons which offer both private and commercial service on small aircraft and helicopters. The Long Island Rail Road provides limited rail service seven days per week via the Montauk Branch connecting towns and hamlets in the Hamptons to Montauk and New York City. Hampton Jitney and Hampton Luxury Liner coach bus services provide slightly more frequent passenger travel between New York City and the Hamptons, especially during summer months. Local Suffolk County buses also provide service to neighboring areas.

In popular culture

In films
 The 1975 documentary Grey Gardens follows the eccentric aunt and cousin of Jacqueline Bouvier Kennedy in a home in great disrepair located in East Hampton.
 Characters in Eternal Sunshine of the Spotless Mind visit Montauk in the subconscious.
 Filmmaker Woody Allen depicts characters visiting the Hamptons for vacations in his films Annie Hall (1977), Interiors (1978), and Blue Jasmine (2013).
 Something's Gotta Give, a 2003 romantic comedy by Nancy Myers depicts a couple finding love later in life at a Hamptons beach house.
 In Inside Job, a 2010 documentary film about the financial crisis of 2007–2010 directed by Charles H. Ferguson, the film covers a bird's eye view of the beaches and homes in the area.

In television
 Numerous episodes of The Real Housewives of New York City are filmed in and around the Hamptons, where the cast members participate in the East End social life and charitable events and several cast members own (or previously owned) eastern Long Island homes, e.g., Cindy Barshop, Kelly Killoren Bensimon, LuAnn de Lesseps, Ramona Singer, and Jill Zarin. (Exemplary episodes include 1.3 "The Hamptons"; 2.2 "Hamptons Retreat, No Surrender"; 2.3 "On Their High Horses"; and 4.4 "Ramona'd".)
 Multiple episodes of The Affair were set and filmed in Montauk and East Hampton areas. Recognisable locations from the show include Deep Hollow Ranch, Marine Boulevard, Montauk Point Lighthouse Museum and The Lobster Roll. 
 In the show Louie, comedian Louie CK performs a stand up comedy set at a private charity function in the Hamptons with comedian Jerry Seinfeld.
 Reality stars Khloé Kardashian, Kourtney Kardashian and Scott Disick are the main cast of the show Kourtney and Khloé take The Hamptons, that begun airing in November 2014. The show is based on the family spending the summer at a house in the North Sea area of The Hamptons, and features guest appearances from other members of the famous family.
The Castle episode "Murder He Wrote" is mainly set in The Hamptons and the ocean front house Castle owns there. Castle and Beckett marry at the same house at the end of "The Time of Our Lives".

Other appearances in culture
 In basketball, an iteration of the Golden State Warriors' so-called "Death Lineup", consisting of Stephen Curry, Kevin Durant, Draymond Green, Andre Iguodala, and Klay Thompson, is more often called the "Hamptons Five". The term was coined by San Francisco Bay Area journalist Tim Kawakami in the 2016 NBA offseason after the Warriors signed Durant out of free agency. This played off the fact that the other four named players, all part of the original "Death Lineup", traveled with team officials to The Hamptons to meet with and recruit Durant.

References

External links

 "Real Estate 101 in the Hamptons", The New York Times.
 "Studios by the Sea", Vanity Fair, August 2000.
 "The Most Expensive Golf Courses in the Country", Forbes magazine.
“Ruffling A Few Feathers In One Of America’s Most Exclusive Retreats, The Hamptons” Tayfun King, Fast Track, BBC World News (2008-08-01)
"Hamptons Car services, Hamptons to NYC route"- Hamptonsvipride

 
Geography of Suffolk County, New York
Tourist attractions in Suffolk County, New York
Tourist attractions on Long Island